José Luis Sánchez Paraíso (21 June 1942 – 18 July 2017) was a Spanish sprinter. He competed in the men's 100 metres at the 1968 Summer Olympics and in the men's 4 × 100 metres relay at the 1972 and 1976 Summer Olympics. He was also national champion twelve times; eight in the 100 metres (1963–66, 1971–73, and 1979) and four in the 200 metres (1962, 1964–65, and 1966).

References

External links
 

1942 births
2017 deaths
Athletes (track and field) at the 1968 Summer Olympics
Athletes (track and field) at the 1972 Summer Olympics
Athletes (track and field) at the 1976 Summer Olympics
Spanish male sprinters
Olympic athletes of Spain
Sportspeople from the Province of Salamanca